Angut may refer to:
 Angut-e Gharbi Rural District
 Angut-e Sharqi Rural District